Samuel Mendola (born August 26, 1942, Buffalo, New York, United States), known professionally as Vic Dana, is an American singer, dancer and actor.

Biography
Discovered by Sammy Davis Jr., Dana was an excellent male dancer, particularly in tap, and was encouraged by Davis to move to Los Angeles to further his career. With the decline of dancing as a form of entertainment, Dana began a singing career. He is best known for his 1965 recording of the Sid Tepper and Roy C. Bennett song "Red Roses for a Blue Lady", that was a Billboard Top Ten hit single. His album of the same title made it into the Top 20. Preceding this success as a solo artist, Dana was the lead singer of The Fleetwoods (for live performances only), replacing original vocalist Gary Troxel when Troxel went into the U.S. Navy.

Other hit recordings on the Billboard Hot 100 chart in the 1960s: "Little Altar Boy", "I Will", "More", "Shangri-La", "I Love You Drops", and "If I Never Knew Your Name". "I Love You Drops" was written and recorded by country singer Bill Anderson, and was popular enough to be recorded by others including Don Cherry and Teresa Brewer. He also scored a chart record in 1970 with Neil Diamond's "Red Red Wine", years before it was turned into a UK number one hit by UB40. His last nationally charted record was Larry Weiss' "Lay Me Down (Roll Me Out To Sea)" on the Casino label, which hit the top 20 on Billboard's Adult Contemporary survey.

Six Dana songs reached the Music Vendor (later Record World) chart without appearing in the Billboard chart.

Dana had a brief foray as an actor on three TV appearances, first in 1965 on the series Burke's Law in the episode "Who Killed Wimbledon Hastings?" as Forrest Shea, and then in 1966 on the WWII drama Combat! in the episode "Ask Me No Questions" as Pvt. James. He also appeared in the 1968 television movie Shadow Over Elveron as Tino.

Personal life
Dana has three children, Steven, Jason and Justin. Dana retired from the entertainment industry and now resides in Paducah, Kentucky.

Discography

Albums
This Is Vic Dana (1962)
Warm & Wild (1962)
More (1963)
Shangri-La (1964)
Vic Dana Now! (1964)
Red Roses for a Blue Lady (1965)
Moonlight and Roses (1965)
Crystal Chandelier (1966)
Viva! Vic Dana (1966)
Town & Country (1966)
Golden Greats (1966)
Warm & Wonderful (1966)
Little Altar Boy and Other Christmas Songs (1966)
Foreign Affairs (1967)
On the Country Side (1967)
If I Never Knew Your Name (1970)

Singles

References

External links
 Vic Dana discography at Discogs

1942 births
Living people
20th-century American singers
20th-century American male singers
American male dancers
American male pop singers
American tap dancers
Columbia Records artists
Dolton Records artists
Glendale High School (Glendale, California) alumni
Liberty Records artists
Musicians from Buffalo, New York
Singers from New York (state)
Traditional pop music singers